The Memorial for the Disappeared is a memorial wall at the entrance to Santiago General Cemetery in Santiago, Chile, commemorating the 3,000 people disappeared or murdered following the 1973 Chilean coup d'état. Inscribed in the long, high, marble wall are the names of 3,000 people disappeared or murdered following the 1973 Chilean coup d'état. The wall serves as a crypt. When newly identified remains are brought to the wall, their listed names move from "disappeared" to "deceased". The memorial is frequented by visitors and at its base are piled flower bouquets, photographs, and calls for governmental action. Atop the wall is a line from Chilean poet Raul Zurita, translated as, "All my love is here and here has stayed: Tied to the rocks, to the sea, to the mountains". It is the best known Chilean memory site.

See also
 Patio 29

References

Further reading

External links 
 

Buildings and structures in Santiago Metropolitan Region
Monuments and memorials in Santiago
Military dictatorship of Chile (1973–1990)
Human rights in Chile
Enforced disappearances in Chile